Diocese of Spokane may refer to:

 Roman Catholic Diocese of Spokane
 Episcopal Diocese of Spokane